Chopwell is a village in the Metropolitan Borough of Gateshead, Tyne and Wear, England,  west of Rowlands Gill and  north of Hamsterley. At the 2011 Census, it had a population of 9,395.

In 1150, Bishop Pudsey granted the Manor of Chopwell to the first Abbot of Newminster.  Newminster Abbey retained possession of the manor until the dissolution of the Monasteries in 1536.

Traditionally an area of coal mining, Chopwell was nicknamed "Little Moscow" because of the strong support for the Communist Party. Chopwell counts "Marx Terrace" (after Karl Marx) and "Lenin Terrace" (after Vladimir Lenin) among its street names, and during the 1926 General Strike the Union Flag at the council offices was taken down and replaced with the Soviet flag. Another notable street, site of the former Chopwell Junior School, "Fannybush Lane", was renamed "Whittonstall Road" by the local authority in the 1990s after its street sign was repeatedly stolen.

In 1974, Chopwell became part of the metropolitan county of Tyne and Wear and the metropolitan borough of Gateshead, after previously being part of the administrative county of Durham.

See also
Chopwell Colliery

References

External links

Villages in Tyne and Wear
Communism in the United Kingdom
Gateshead